The Mask is a thriller novel by American writer Dean Koontz originally released under the pseudonym Owen West in 1981. Koontz later re-released the novel under his own name.

Plot summary

An amnesic blonde girl appears in the middle of traffic on a busy day. Carol and Paul, a married couple, are drawn to her, seeing her as the child they never had, they take her in. Then Carol begins to have nightmares about ghastly noises in the dead of night, a bloody face in a mirror, and a razor-sharp ax.

External links
The Mask Book Review

1981 American novels
Novels by Dean Koontz
American horror novels
Works published under a pseudonym
Jove Books books